Alice Baxter (née Hibbert) is a former English news presenter, who currently works for Equinor ASA. She previously presented The Briefing on BBC One, BBC World News and the BBC News Channel. She joined World Business Report in the summer of 2012 and presented its early morning edition, programming viewed mostly by audiences in European and international markets.

Education
Baxter is a history and drama undergraduate, with a MPhil in modern history from Cambridge University and a diploma in broadcast journalism from Cardiff University.

Early career
Before joining the BBC, Baxter worked as a presenter at Sky News and in Moscow as a senior international correspondent and presenter for RT where she anchored major news and business stories for over six years.

Personal life
Baxter is married to Jamie, she went on maternity leave in the autumn 2016, returning March 2017. She went on maternity leave again in the summer 2018, returning September 2019. She then went on maternity leave again in the spring 2020, returning January 2021. Baxter is a keen skier and keeps fit. She has completed a number of half and full marathons.

References 

Year of birth missing (living people)
Living people
BBC newsreaders and journalists
Place of birth missing (living people)
21st-century British journalists
Alumni of the University of Cambridge
Alumni of Cardiff University
British women television journalists